The Bob Moog Memorial Foundation was created after the death of Dr. Robert Moog in 2005, and officially launched in August, 2006. His family established the foundation to honor the legacy of Moog "through its mission of igniting creativity at the intersection of music, history, science, and innovation." The foundation is an independent, donor-driven 501(c)(3) non-profit organization with no formal affiliations with  Moog Music, Inc. The foundation is located in Asheville, N.C., where Moog spent the last 25 years of his life.

The Bob Moog Foundation's projects include Dr. Bob's SoundSchool, which teaches the science of sound through the magic of music, the Bob Moog Foundation Archives, an effort to preserve and protect Dr. Moog's extensive and historic archive and a museum named the "Moogseum," an innovative educational, historic, and cultural facility located in Asheville, North Carolina. The Waves of Inspiration exhibit, a selection of pictures, documents and items from Bob Moog's archives, took place in August 2009 at the Museum of Making Music. A Minimoogseum was installed at the Orange Peel in 2010 following a ribbon cutting ceremony by the Beastie Boys. The Moogseum was officially opened on August 15, 2019, with a multi-day ceremony in Asheville, NC including presentations by sonic pioneers Herb Deutsch and Larry Fast, and interviews and performances by Patrick Moraz and Lisa Bella Donna.

Moog, an electrical engineer and American pioneer of electronic musical instruments like the Theremin and the Moog Synthesizer, left an indelible mark on the music industry. His instruments have been included in recordings by Wendy Carlos, Keith Emerson, The Beatles, The Beach Boys, Stevie Wonder, Yes and a host of others.

Board of directors

Executive Director: Michelle Moog-Koussa
President: David Mash
Treasurer: Terrence VanArkel
Vice President and Secretary: Daniel Liston Keller
Jerry Kovarsky
Marc Willis
Henry Panion, III
Sally Sparks
Yvonne Spicer
Michael Whalen
Chris Halaby

References

External links
 Bob Moog Memorial Foundation for Electronic Music
NAMM Oral History Interview with Michelle Moog-Koussa August 28, 2009

Electronic music organizations
Educational foundations in the United States
Organizations established in 2006
Non-profit organizations based in North Carolina
2006 establishments in North Carolina